The Raschèr Saxophone Quartet is a professional ensemble of four saxophonists which performs classical and modern music.

The quartet was founded in the United States in 1969 by prominent classical saxophonist Sigurd Raschèr and his daughter, Carina (Karin).  Some years later the quartet relocated to Germany and has been based there ever since.

The Quartet has appeared at major concert halls in Europe and the United States, including
Carnegie Hall and Lincoln Center in New York City, the Kennedy Center in Washington, D.C., Opera Bastille Paris, Royal Festival Hall in London, Philharmonie Cologne, Concertgebouw, Schauspielhaus Berlin, Berliner Philharmonie, Musikverein Vienna, Tonhalle Zürich.

The quartet has received strong reviews and was acclaimed as the "Uncrowned Kings of the Saxophone"  by the Wiener Zeitung.

Personnel
Linda Bangs-Urban, baritone saxophone, 1969–1992
Kenneth Coon, baritone saxophone, 1992–2019
John-Edward Kelly, alto saxophone, 1981–1991
Christine Rall, soprano saxophone, 2002–present
Carina Raschèr, soprano saxophone, 1969 until 2002
Sigurd Raschèr, alto saxophone, 1969 until 1980
Elliot Riley, alto saxophone, 2001–present
Bruce Weinberger, tenor saxophone, 1969–2014
Harry Kinross White, alto saxophone, 1990–2001
Andreas van Zoelen, tenor saxophone, 2014–present
Oscar Trompenaars, baritone saxophone, 2019–present

Original works written for the quartet
Sigurd Raschèr's tireless pursuit of classical composers led many of them to compose works dedicated to the quartet. The continued efforts by the group after Sigurd Raschèr's departure, combined with the impressive technical and musical abilities of the quartet, have led over 250 composers to dedicate works to the group.

Composers who have written for the group include:
Kalevi Aho
Lera Auerbach
Erik Bergman
Luciano Berio
Günter Bialas
Michael Denhoff
Franco Donatoni
Elena Firsova
Philip Glass
Sofia Gubaidulina
Cristóbal Halffter
Walter S. Hartley
Roman Haubenstock-Ramati
Jouni Kaipainen
Tristan Keuris
Ton de Leeuw
Anders Nilsson
Pehr Henrik Nordgren
Per Nørgård
Miklós Maros
Enrique Raxach
Alexander Raskatov
Jan Sandström
 Sven-David Sandström
Wolfgang von Schweinitz
Steven Stucky
Dimitri Terzakis
Erich Urbanner
John Worley
Charles Wuorinen
Iannis Xenakis
Ruth Zechlin

Recordings
Recitals:
 Strange Exclaiming Music (2009) - Eric Moe; NAXOS 7951592
 The Concerto Project, Volume 3 (2008) - Philip Glass; OMM0042
 Victoria Borisova-Ollas - The Triumph of Heaven (2008) - Victoria Borisova-Ollas; PSCD 171
 Saxophone (2002) - Philip Glass; OMM0006
 Europe (2001) - Hindemith, Penderecki, Halffter, Nørgard, Xenakis; BIS-CD 1153
 America (1999) - Wuorinen, Corbett, Starer, Adler, Florio, Peterson; BIS-CD 953
 Music for Saxophones (1999) - Bach, Glazounov, Reich, Starer, Keuris, Koch; Cala CD 77003
 The Raschèr Saxophone Quartet (1994) - Xenakis, Bergman, Dünser, Denhoff, Bialas, Terzakis; Caprice 21435
 The Rascher Saxophone Quartet (1987) - Bach, Glaser, Karkoff, Koch, Maros, Sandstrom; Caprice 21349
 Works Of Nicola Lefanu (1986) - Karkoff, LeFanu, Maros, Urbanner; Col Legno

Concerti written for the Raschèr Quartet with Orchestra:
In Memoriam Pehr Henrik Nordgren (2012) - Nordgren, Lapland Chamber Orchestra  John Storgards, Cond.; ABCD 322
 The Eight Sounds (2011) - Beamish, Chen Yi, Stucky, Stuttgart Chamber Orchestra, Robin Engelen, Cond.; BIS-CD 1821 
 Water Music (2009) - Dean, Swedish Chamber Orchestra, Heinz Karl Gruber, Cond.; BIS-CD-1576 
 From Equinox to Solstice (2003) Nilsson, Hvoslef, and Kaipainen - Swedish Chamber Orchestra; BIS-CD-1203 
 Oolit (2002) - Maros, Philharmonia Hungarica, Georg Alexander Albrecht, Cond.; Caprice 21670 
 Philip Glass Symphony No.2 (1998), Stuttgart Chamber Orchestra, Dennis Russell Davies, Cond.; Nonesuch 79496-2

Works for Saxophone Quartet and Voices
 Circadian Rhythms:Mathew Rosenblum (2012) - Mathew Rosenblum, Calmus Ensemble; New World Records 80736
 Chorbuch-Les Inventions Dadolphe (2012) - Mauricio Kagel, Netherlands Chamber Choir, Klaas Stok, Cond.; Winter & Winter 910 191-2
 Canticum Novissimi Testamenti II (1996) - Luciano Berio, London Sinfonietta Voices, Seymon Bychkov, Cond.; Philips 446 094-2

Works with other instruments:
Die Kunst der Fuge (2011) - Bach, Carsten Klomp, Organ.; No Label
 New York Counterpoint (2002) - Bach, Denhoff, Grieg, Kastner, Reich, Raschèr Saxophone Orchestra, Bruce Weinberger, Cond.; BIS-NL-CD-5023
 Gubaidulina (1995) - Kroumata Percussion Ensemble; BIS-CD 710
Anders Nilsson: KRASCH! (1995) - Gubaidulina, Nilsson, Kox, Kroumata Percussion Ensemble; Caprice 21441

Raschèr Saxophone Orchestra
The Raschèr Saxophone Orchestra is a professional saxophone orchestra with 12 musicians, was founded in 1999 or 2000. It is conducted by Bruce Weinberger, the tenor saxophonist in the Raschèr Quartet, and includes among its ranks the current members of the quartet as well as some former members.

External links
Raschèr Saxophone Quartet official web site

Musical groups established in 1969
German musical groups
Saxophone quartets